In the Latter Day Saint movement, a general conference is a meeting for all members of the church for conducting general church business and instruction. When Joseph Smith established the Church of Christ in 1830, he was instructed by revelation that the church "are to meet in conference once in three months, or from time to time as said conferences shall direct or appoint; And said conferences are to do whatever church business is necessary to be done at the time." The church met in conferences regularly until Smith's death in 1844.

Since Smith's death, the churches of the Latter Day Saint movement have continued the tradition of meeting in regular general conferences.

Frequency and locations
The first general conference of the newly formed Church of Christ was held on June 9, 1830, in Fayette, New York, presided over by Joseph Smith. It included a gathering of 27 members of the two-month-old church.

Originally, conferences of the church were held approximately every three months, as suggested by a revelation which outlined the initial organization of the church. Beginning in 1832, the conferences were held less frequently, usually to conduct special church business or to respond to special church needs. At these early conferences, Smith would occasionally receive revelations, which were later canonized as part of the Doctrine and Covenants. During this time, rather than convening a general conference, often the church would hold local conferences that were held in various locations. Once the majority of the church gathered in Nauvoo, Illinois, it settled into a more regular pattern of holding general conferences twice per year, in April and October.

The following are the dates and locations of the general conferences from the establishment of the church until Smith's death in 1844:

After Smith's death
Following Smith's death and the resulting succession crisis, general conferences have been practiced in different forms by the various denominations in the Latter Day Saint movement.

General Conferences of The Church of Jesus Christ of Latter-day Saints

In the Church of Jesus Christ of Latter-day Saints (LDS Church), general conferences are a semiannual meeting where general authorities and other church leaders preach sermons and give guidance to church members. Changes to church leadership are also proposed and sustained through the principle of common consent. General conferences are held on the weekends containing the first Sunday in April and the first Sunday in October.

The conferences have been held in Salt Lake City, Utah, since 1848; they were held in the Salt Lake Tabernacle on Temple Square from 1867 to 2000 and in the Conference Center after that. 

Various speakers will generally include all members of the First Presidency and Quorum of the Twelve Apostles, along with other selected church leaders. Almost every general authority of the church is present, though outside the First Presidency and Twelve only a few speak. Non–general authority speakers may include male and female officers of church organizations.

During one session the conducting officer presents all the church's general authorities and general officers for a formal sustaining vote of the membership, and it is usually at this time that any changes among the general church leadership are announced.

Frequently, significant announcements are made at general conference, which may include building sites for new temples or the institution of new policies or programs.

The Tabernacle Choir at Temple Square along with the organist at the Conference Center generally provide the majority of the music at LDS Church general conferences.

World Conference in Community of Christ

World Conference  is the name given to the triennial meeting  of delegates of Community of Christ. They were originally called General Conferences and were held semiannually, or as need arose.

The World Conference is the highest legislative body in the Community of Christ and is empowered to act for the entire church.  Delegates to the conference are elected by Mission Center conferences.  Motions are often debated vigorously and the results are sometimes controversial.  World Conferences are traditionally held at Community of Christ World Headquarters, with the legislative and main worship services held in the Auditorium.

See also

We Thank Thee, O God, for a Prophet

Notes

Further reading

External links
Official General Conference page of The Church of Jesus Christ of Latter-day Saints
Deseret News General Conference page
Archive of LDS Church Conference Reports (October 1897–April 2007)

1830 in Christianity
International conferences in the United States
Latter Day Saint terms
Recurring events established in 1830
Church of Christ (Latter Day Saints)
1830 establishments in New York (state)
Latter Day Saint conferences